UAE Second Division League is the third tier of football league competition in the United Arab Emirates, the league is organised by UAE Football Association for private funded clubs and universities with amateur teams. The league was established in 2019. The league featured 10 teams who played each other twice in its first season however, due to the COVID-19 pandemic in the United Arab Emirates, the UAE footballing season was cancelled and declared a void and all results were null. The UAE FA set a strategy to support featuring more privately owned clubs and football academies in the UAE Football Pyramid. Ahead of the 2022–23 season, the UAE FA confirmed that the format of league will remain as 12 teams, with the introduction of the UAE Third Division League with a promotion-relegation system.

Current teams
As of 2022–23 UAE Second Division League 
''Note: Table lists clubs in alphabetical order.

List of champions
Source:

 2019–20: Quattro
 2020–21: Abtal Al Khaleej
 2021–22: Al Fursan
 2022-23: Gulf United

Performance by club

Performance by city

References

External links
UAE FA Official website 

Football leagues in the United Arab Emirates
Third level football leagues in Asia